It's the Law is a Canadian legal information television series which aired on CBC Television in 1956.

Premise
Legal concepts and information were explained to average Canadians on this series. Each episode featured an explanation of a legal concept followed by its dramatic portrayal as a case. The show then concluded with further discussion of by a member of the Canadian Bar Association which supported CBC's production of the series.

Cecil Wright, the University of Toronto's law dean, joined host Frank Peddie as a series regular. Actors Cec Linder, William Needles, Ed McNamara and Sandy Webster were featured in the dramatic segments.

Scheduling
This half-hour series was broadcast on Tuesdays at 10:00 p.m. (Eastern) from 1 May to 26 June 1956.

References

External links
 
 

CBC Television original programming
1956 Canadian television series debuts
1956 Canadian television series endings
Black-and-white Canadian television shows